The Pacific Coast Professional Basketball League was a professional basketball league with teams from the Pacific Northwest in the United States and Canada. The league existed for two seasons, 1946-47 and 1947-48.

Teams
Three teams played in both seasons:

Bellingham Fircrests
Portland Indians
Vancouver Hornets

These teams played in the 1946-47 season, but dropped out for the 1947-48 season:
Salem Trailblazers
Seattle Blue Devils
Spokane Orphans
Yakima Ramblers

These teams joined the league for the 1947-48 season:
Astoria Royal Chinooks
Seattle Athletics
Tacoma Mountaineers

Champions
1946-47: Bellingham Fircrests won round robin playoffs; chose not to play in World Professional Basketball Tournament, so runner-up Portland Indians went instead, losing to the Sheboygan Redskins in the first round.
1947-48: Portland Indians defeated Seattle Athletics 3 games to 1. (The fourth game was disallowed after a timekeeping error and replayed two days later with Portland winning 76–74).

Notable players
George (Porky) Andrews
Gale Bishop
Norm Baker
Al Brightman
Boody Gilbertson
Noble Jorgensen
John Mandic
Ken Suesens
Urgel (Slim) Wintermute

References

External links
 History of the Pacific Coast Professional Basketball League

1948 disestablishments in the United States
Defunct basketball leagues in the United States
Basketball leagues in Canada
1948 disestablishments in Canada
Sports leagues disestablished in 1948
Sports leagues established in 1946